Aryeh Abraham Frimer  (Hebrew: אריה אברהם פרימר) (born November 24, 1946) is an American-Israeli Active Oxygen Chemist and specialist on women and Jewish law.

Biography
Aryeh Abraham Frimer was born in Minneapolis, Minnesota, United States, to Rabbi Dr. Norman E. Frimer and Esther Miriam Frimer on November 24, 1946, but spent most of his formative years in Brooklyn, NY. He graduated summa cum laude with honors from Brooklyn College (Phi Beta Kappa; Sigma Xi) with a B.S. degree in Chemistry in 1969.  During his undergraduate years he also studied at Yeshivat Kerem B'Yavneh in Israel and then Yeshivat Eretz Israel, Brooklyn NY, with Rabbi Judah Gershuni (one of the last students of Rabbi Abraham Isaac Kook) - ultimately receiving Rabbinic Ordination. While a graduate student in organic chemistry at Harvard University with Prof. Paul Doughty Bartlett, he was a National Science Foundation and Danforth Foundation Fellow. He was also appointed Assistant to the Hillel Director, serving as Rabbi to the Harvard-Radcliffe Orthodox Minyan from 1969-1974.  Upon completing his Ph.D. at Harvard in 1974, Aryeh and his family moved to Israel becoming a Post-Doctoral Fellow at The Weizmann Institute of Science with Prof. Dov Elad. He then joined the faculty of Bar Ilan University in 1975, where he is the Ethel and David Resnick Professor of Active Oxygen Chemistry and former Chemistry Department Chairman. From 1982-1983, Frimer was appointed Visiting Medical Scientist at Brookhaven National Laboratory in Upton, Long Island, NY. From 1990-2004, he spent a sabbatical year and consecutive summers as a National Research Council Fellow and an Ohio Aerospace Institute Senior Research Associate at NASA's Glenn Research Center in Cleveland, Ohio. In June 2015, he received Bar Ilan University’s Excellence in Teaching Award, and in October 2015, he became a professor emeritus. Aryeh and his wife Esther (Neiman) Frimer have four children and twelve grandchildren and live in Rehovot, Israel.

Scientific Interests and Publications
Frimer’s research interests include: (1) The organic chemistry of active oxygen species: singlet and triplet molecular oxygen, peroxides, oxy-radicals and superoxide anion radical. (2) The organic chemistry of active oxygen species within organic media, liposomal lipid bilayers, and biomembranes. (3) The preparation of high temperature thermo-oxidatively stable aerospace polymers. (4) The preparation, characterization and neutralization of “green” reduced sensitivity high energy compounds. (5) The formation and chemistry of lithium-oxygen species in Li-O batteries.
Frimer has published 150 scientific articles, reviews and books in the area of active oxygen chemistry, and given presentations at more than 120 scientific meetings.
In 1985, together with Prof. Ionel Rosental, he edited two special issues of the Israeli Journal of Chemistry on “Active Oxygen Chemistry”. In the same year, the Chemical Rubber Company (CRC) published his four volume series on "Singlet O".

Rabbinic Studies and Writings
In addition to his scientific work, Frimer has lectured on Judaism, Zionism and Jewish Identity for officer training courses of the Israel Defense Forces.  He has also published some 60 Torah articles and lectured internationally on various aspects of Jewish tradition and Halakha (Jewish law). He is known most prominently for his scholarly writings on the status of women in Jewish ritual and law. He serves on the Rabbinic Board of the Rabbi Jacob Berman Community Center – Tiferet Moshe Synagogue in Rehovot, Israel. The Community Center maintains a website with more than 80 recorded lectures by Frimer given predominantly from 1997-2000 at the Tiferet Moshe Synagogue. 
The site contains assorted published papers, audio files, source material and unedited lecture notes on women and Jewish law. Frimer has published, inter alia, on women and minyan, 
women’s megilla readings,  
women in Jewish leadership roles,  
on questions of liturgy and ritual,  
and Orthodox Feminism. 
Together with his brother Dov, Frimer has published several seminal papers on Women’s Prayer (Tefilla) Groups 
and Partnership Minyanim including the issue of women’s aliyyot.,

References

See also
Kavod HaBriyot
Partnership Minyan

1946 births
Living people
Academic staff of Bar-Ilan University
Brooklyn College alumni
Harvard Graduate School of Arts and Sciences alumni
Israeli chemists
Jewish chemists
Israeli feminists
Israeli Modern Orthodox rabbis
People from Rehovot
American emigrants to Israel
People from Brooklyn